The Regent on Broadway is a large theatre in Palmerston North, New Zealand, named so because it is the Regent Theatre on Broadway Avenue.

History
Designed in 1929 by Charles Holingshed of Sydney, the theatre complex was officially opened to the public on 4 July 1930. Its original use was as a cinema and opera house, but, with the decline of the movie over the decades, the Regent closed in 1991. However, the public response was so great, that, in 1993, Palmerston North City Council agreed to contribute the sum of $10,000,000, followed by a community donation of $1,700,000, and $1,000,000 from New Zealand Lotteries Grant Board.

The auditorium has painted panels on the roof, all of which were cleaned during the renovations of the 1990s. The staircase leading up to the mezzanine floor is carpeted in the centre, with marble on the sides. The lobby is carpeted, with a special weave being manufactured by Feltex carpets, an exact copy of the linoleum, still lying underneath the carpet. The mezzanine floor has carved kowhaiwhai panels in the ceiling.

Today
Regent On Broadway is described as being "among the top four performing arts centres in New Zealand",[By whom?] alongside Wellington Town Hall, Christchurch Town Hall and Auckland Town Hall. The auditorium can seat 1393 people; 721 on the ground floor and 672 in the circle (upstairs). Some of the downstairs seating can be removed for functions such as dinners and ballroom dancing. Adjacent to the auditorium are several small dressing rooms, and larger dressing rooms are up a flight of stairs. The venue boasts a large function room, upstairs from the mezzanine, and a rehearsal studio, which is used for a variety of activities, ranging from ballet dancing to stage rehearsals. Because of the wide range of activities available, it is one of New Zealand's busiest venues. It remains the only large theatre in the greater Palmerston North area.

References

External links

 Regent on Broadway website

Theatres in New Zealand
Culture in Palmerston North
Buildings and structures in Palmerston North
Theatres completed in 1930
Tourist attractions in Manawatū-Whanganui
1930s architecture in New Zealand